Ilex amelanchier, the swamp holly or sarvis holly, is a rare species of holly from the southeastern United States. It is a close relative of mountain holly (Ilex mucronata) which used to be placed in a monotypic genus Nemopanthus.  Ilex amelanchier grows near water, for example on streambanks.

The dull red drupes appear in October to November, and may persist until the following spring.

Its native range is limited to the Atlantic coastal plain and gulf coastal plain, and extends as far south as Florida, as far west as Louisiana, and as far north as North Carolina.

References

External links
Photo of herbarium specimen at Missouri Botanical Garden, isotype of Ilex amelanchier 
Louisiana Department of Wildlife and Fisheries, rare plants of Louisiana includes photos, description, Louisiana distribution map
Carolina Nature: photos
Lady Bird Johnson Wildflower Center, University of Texas

amelanchier
Endemic flora of the United States
Trees of the Southeastern United States
Plants described in 1860
Least concern flora of the United States
Taxa named by Alvan Wentworth Chapman
Taxa named by Moses Ashley Curtis